Ilex coriacea, sometimes known as large gallberry or sweet gallberry, is a shrub in the Holly family native to coastal areas in the United States from Virginia to Texas. It exists primarily as an understory plant in pine forests, and is sometimes stimulated by regular controlled burnings.

It has been widely planted north of its native range and to some extent in Europe, preferring moist, but not waterlogged acidic soil.

The plant is an important nectar source for beekeepers, making a mild flavored, light colored honey, especially in Florida, South Carolina, and Georgia.

References

Gallberry in Michigan Bee Plants (includes photo of blossom)

coriacea
Taxa named by Alvan Wentworth Chapman
Taxa named by Frederick Traugott Pursh